The Ipswich Jets are an Australian rugby league football club based in Ipswich, Queensland. Their name comes from nearby RAAF Base Amberley, one of the largest airbases in Australia. The Jets compete in the Queensland Cup competition. Originally in the 1980s their colours were green and white, but in recent years gold has been added to the combination.

History
Ipswich were one of the earliest teams to join the Queensland Rugby League after it was founded as the Queensland Amateur Rugby Football League in 1909. Ipswich even contested two of the QARFL's first three grand finals, winning the title in its first year in the competition in 1910. But a long absence from the competition started shortly thereafter, and Ipswich was not represented in Queensland's top league again until the mid-1980s.

From 1982 to 1985, an Ipswich representative team competed in the statewide comps.  The following year, an Ipswich team was introduced to the Brisbane Rugby League premiership.  They were coached in the 1980s by legendary Australian halfback Tommy Raudonikis. The team's most famous product was Allan Langer, who in 1987 was selected to play halfback for the Queensland State of Origin team while playing for the Jets in the Brisbane Rugby League premiership, even though he was not as yet playing in the New South Wales Rugby League's Winfield Cup which was, at that time, fast becoming the premier rugby league competition in the world.

Kerrod and Kevin Walters also played for the club with Langer in their early years. When all three played together for the Brisbane Broncos later, they were dubbed "the Ipswich connection". Kevin later returned to coach the Queensland Cup side in the mid-2000s before moving to Europe to coach in the Super League. Their brother, Steve Walters, played originally for Booval Swifts in the Ipswich Rugby League.

The Jets reached the Grand Finals of the 1988 and 1989 Brisbane Rugby League premiership.

Ipswich continued playing in the Queensland Cup when it was founded in 1997. In the 2007 Queensland Cup, the Jets caused a surprise by upsetting many of their more fancied rivals and pressing for a semi-finals spot, when they had been predicted by most tipsters to finish last.

At the end of the 2008 Queensland Cup preliminary rounds, Ipswich finished four points clear at the top of the ladder, winning their first-ever Queensland Cup minor premiership. As Kevin Walters moved to Europe to pursue a career coaching in the Super League, his assistant and former teammate at both the Canberra Raiders and the Broncos, Glenn Lazarus, was promoted to head coach.

Brothers Ben and Shane Walker who assisted Lazarus in 2009 and 2010 have been appointed co-head coaches in 2011, 2012 and again in 2013. Shane played 149 games for the Broncos and South Sydney from 1996 to 2006, while Ben 135 NRL games for Brisbane, Northern Eagles, Manly Sea Eagles and South Sydney between 1995 and 2006, as well as 44 games for the London Broncos (1995–96) and the Leeds Rhinos (2002). Ben was the NRL's leading point scorer in 2001 when he scored 279 points (18 tries, 103 goals and 1 field goal) in his only season with the Northern Eagles.

In 2020, after nine seasons in charge, the Walker brothers left the club. They were replaced by former Jets' captain Keiron Lander.

NRL bid

In 2010 the Jets announced they will be part of a bid for a licence in an expanded National Rugby League.

Results

Brisbane Rugby League premiership
1986: 8th
1987: 6th
1988: Runners-up
1989: Runners-up
1990: 7th
1991: 6th
1992: 10th (last)
1993: Semi finalists
1994: Semi finalists
1995: 8th
1996: Eliminated in preliminary rounds

Queensland Cup
1997: 13th
1998: 13th
1999: 10th
2000: 6th
2001: 8th
2002: Runners-up
2003: Semi finalists
2004: 10th
2005: 9th
2006: 9th
2007: Semi finalists
2008: Runners-up
2009: 8th
2010: 12th
2011: 5th
2012: 5th
2013: 5th
2014: 5th
2015: 3rd (Premiers)
2016: 7th
2017: 7th
2018: 6th
2019: 9th

Players

Honours

Queensland Cup
 Premierships: 1
  2015
 Runners Up: 2
  2002, 2008
 Minor Premiership: 1
  2008

Records

Queensland Cup
Most Games for Club
258, Danny Coburn
192, Tyson Lofipo
154, Brendon Marshall
150, Nathaniel Neale
138, Sam Martin

Most Points for Club
594, Marmin Barba
594, Steven West
505, Wes Conlon
474, Brendon Lindsay
408, Donald Malone

Most Tries for Club
79, Marmin Barba
67, Donald Malone
66, Michael Purclel
64, Ricky Bird
59, Brendon Marshall

See also

National Rugby League reserves affiliations

References

External links
 Official Site

 
Sport in Ipswich, Queensland
Rugby league teams in Queensland
Rugby clubs established in 1986
1986 establishments in Australia